Volume Cartography is the name of a computer program for locating and mapping 2-dimensional surfaces within a 3-dimensional object.  X-rays can reveal minute details of what is in an object, and computer program such as Volume Cartography can organize the images into layers, a process called volume rendering.

Burned scrolls
Ein Gedi is a community that was destroyed by Byzantine emperor Justinian in 800 AD. The burning of the synagogue reduced its scrolls on parchment to lumps of charcoal. The burned scrolls were discovered by archaeologists during an excavation in 1970. They were so fragile that they disintegrated whenever touched. Various attempts were made to mechanically unwind and read the scrolls, but the scrolls were too delicate.

In 2016, W. Brent Seales, a researcher at the University of Kentucky, created a set of computer programs called Volume Cartography to reconstruct the layers of text in a digital X-ray image of the one of the scrolls, known as the En-Gedi Scroll.

Process

Volumetric scan
An X-ray microtomography (Micro-CT) scanner creates a 3-dimensional image of the sample.  An X-ray scanner can produce a spot as small as 10 microns.

Segmentation
Surfaces are found and broken into small triangles, resulting in a triangular mesh defining the surface.

Texturing
Each point in the mesh is assigned a weight, indicating the likelihood that the point contains writing.

Flattening
The mesh surface is mapped onto a plane.

Merging
The pieces of the recovered surface are assembled into a single image.

References

Cartography
Data visualization software
Hebrew manuscripts